Minnesota Aviation Hall of Fame, Inc. is a nonprofit corporation, recognized by the State of Minnesota as a means of honoring aviation pioneers (both living and deceased) within the state.

The Minnesota Aviation Hall of Fame collects and maintains a biographical file on each significant Minnesota aviation figure. These files include interview tapes, photos and other memorabilia.

Replicas of the award plaques given to the Minnesota Aviation Hall of Fame inductees are on display in the Wings of the North aviation museum located near the Flying Cloud Airport control tower in Eden Prairie, Minnesota. More than 200 Hall of Fame Inductee plaques are displayed.

See also

 North American aviation halls of fame
National Aviation Hall of Fame
American Combat Airman Hall of Fame
Arizona Aviation Hall of Fame
Colorado Aviation Hall of Fame
Iowa Aviation Hall of Fame
Aviation Hall of Fame and Museum of New Jersey
Science Museum Oklahoma
Texas Aviation Hall of Fame
Utah Aviation Hall of Fame
Western Canada Aviation Museum
Cirrus Aircraft

External links
Minnesota Aviation Hall of Fame
Wings of the North

Aviation history of the United States
Aviation halls of fame
Aviation pioneers
History organizations based in the United States
Halls of fame in Minnesota
State halls of fame in the United States
Aerospace museums in Minnesota
Museums in Duluth, Minnesota